The 2nd National Hockey League All-Star Game took place at Chicago Stadium, home of the Chicago Black Hawks, on November 3, 1948. For the second year in a row, the game saw the Toronto Maple Leafs play a team of NHL all-stars. The All-Stars won the game 3–1.

Game summary

Referee: Bill Chadwick
Linesmen: Sammy Babcock, Mush March

Rosters

Notes

Named to the first All-Star team in 1947–48.
Named to the second All-Star team in 1947–48.

References
 
 New York Times, November 4, 1948, P. 42 -- Specifies Chicago Stadium as site

02nd National Hockey League All-Star Game
All
1948
Ice hockey competitions in Chicago
November 1948 sports events in the United States
1948 in Illinois
1940s in Chicago